Benjamin Sehene (born 1959) is a Rwandan author whose work primarily focuses on questions of identity and the events surrounding the Rwandan genocide. He spent much of his life in Canada and lives in France.

Sehene was born in Kigali to a Tutsi family. His family fled Rwanda in 1963 for Uganda, and he studied in Paris at the Sorbonne in the early 1980s, before emigrating to Canada in 1984. He lives in Paris. He is a member of PEN International.

In the aftermath of the 1994 genocide, Sehene returned to Rwanda, hoping to better understand what had happened. He subsequently wrote Le Piège ethnique (The Ethnic Trap) (1999), a study of ethnic polemics, and Le Feu sous la soutane (Fire under the Cassock) (2005), an historical novel focusing on the true story of a Hutu Catholic priest, Father Stanislas, who offered protection to Tutsi refugees in his church before sexually exploiting the women and participating in massacres. Sehene also contributes articles to the online newspaper rue89.

Publications
 Le Piège Ethnique(The Ethnic Trap)] Dagorno, Paris, (1999) 
 Rwanda's collective amnesia, in The UNESCO Courier, (1999).
 Un sentiment d'insécurité, Play, Paris, 2001
 "Dead Girl Walking" (short story)
 Le Feu sous la soutane (Fire under the Cassock), L'Esprit Frappeur, Paris (2005) 
 "Ta Race!" (Short story), Éditions Vents d'Ailleurs, [La Roque d'Anthéron], France, 2006 
Die ethnische Falle  Wespennest 2006

External links
 Official site
 Interview on SABC(South African TV
 "Dead Girl Walking" (short story)
 Benjamin Sehene's short stories
 Rioting in France: Le Mal Français
 Interview on French culture
 Article in Jeune Afrique
  African writers' index
 Éditions Vents d'Ailleurs
 Rue89

1959 births
Living people
People from Kigali
Tutsi people
Rwandan writers
Rwandan emigrants to Canada
Rwandan expatriates in France
Rwandan expatriates in Uganda
University of Paris alumni